The UruCup is a rugby union competition that was first held in 2015 (from 8–14 March) at the Estadio Charrúa in Montevideo with Charrúas XV, Argentina Jaguars, South American XV, Chile, Uruguay U20 and Argentina U20 taking part.

Argentina Jaguars are the actual champions.

It is a regional tournament supported by the World Rugby which tries to bring the best players in the region. One big objective is that every year the competition upgrades and can invite teams from other continents.

Both Argentina U20 and Uruguay U20 played the tournament as a preparation for the 2015 World Rugby Under 20 Championship and the 2015 World Rugby Under 20 Trophy respectively.

Format 
It has a similar format with tournaments like the IRB Nations Cup in Romania or the IRB Tbilisi Cup in Georgia. The championship will be played in three days, in which there will be three matches per days.

Teams

Current teams (2015)
 Argentina Jaguars
 Argentina U20
 Chile
 Charrúas XV
 Uruguay U20
South American XV

See also 

Americas Rugby Championship
South American Rugby Championship

References

External links 
UruCup Official Twitter site

2015 rugby union tournaments for national teams
International rugby union competitions hosted by Uruguay
2015 in Argentine rugby union
2015 in Chilean sport
2015 in Uruguayan sport
2015 in South American rugby union